The Museum of Automobiles is an automobile museum in the city of Morrilton, Arkansas, adjacent to Petit Jean State Park.  The museum features a collection of antique and classic cars, motorcycles, guns, license plates, arcade machines and automobile memorabilia.  It also includes a rare 1923 Climber touring car, made in Arkansas.

The museum hosts many automobile-related events including swap meets and car shows.

History
Opened in 1964, the museum was founded by Winthrop Rockefeller before he became Governor of Arkansas.  The museum housed Rockefeller's collection of antique and classic cars until his death, and in 1975 the collection was sold to collector Bill Harrah for $947,000, which included 68 motorized vehicles and three that were horse-drawn. The museum building, designed by the Little Rock firm of Ginocchio, Carter, Cromwell and Neylan, and 57-acre grounds were donated to the Arkansas Department of Parks and Tourism.

A new non-profit corporation was formed and reopened the Museum in 1976 with cars on loan from collectors around the country, leasing the building from the state.

Collection
Today the museum features over 30 automobiles that were donated to the collection.  It also retains several cars from Rockefeller's personal vehicles: the 1951 Cadillac that he drove to Arkansas when he made the state his home, his 1967 Cadillac limousine with a Santa Gertrudis bull sterling silver hood ornament, and his 1914 Cretors popcorn wagon.

References

External links
 Museum of Automobiles

Museums in Conway County, Arkansas
Automobile museums in Arkansas
Museums established in 1964
Buildings and structures in Morrilton, Arkansas
1964 establishments in Arkansas